Maëlle Pistoia  (born 4 January 2001), better known as simply Maëlle  is a French singer. In April 2019, she released her first single, titled "Toutes les machines ont un cœur" (lit. "All machines have a heart").

Biography 
Born in January 2001, Maëlle Pistoia is from Tournus in the department of Saône-et-Loire, Burgundy. She has two older sisters. In her childhood she studied piano.

2018: The Voice 
Maëlle's musical career started in 2017, when she submitted a video audition for the seventh edition of the French version of The Voice and became a contestant.

At her blind audition, she performed Guillaume Grand's "Toi et moi", accompanying herself on piano. Three of the four judges, Florent Pagny, Zazie, and Mika turned their chairs. Maëlle chose Zazie as her coach.

For the final audition, she sang Chris Isaak's "Wicked Game".

During the duels, Maëlle battled Gulaan singing Sting's "Fragile", and it was her who Zazie chose to advance to the live rounds.

During the first live round, she sang Korgis' "Everybody's Got to Learn Sometime" and was "saved" by the public. In the quarterfinals, she sang London Grammar's "Wasting My Young Years" and was "saved" by the public.

In the semifinal, she sang France Gall's "Diego libre dans sa tête" and was chosen by the public for the final over B. Demi Mondaine.

In the final held on 12 May 2018, Maëlle performed first Harry Styles' "Sign of the Times", then Vianney's "Je m'en vais" in duo with him, and finally Michel Berger's "Seras-tu là" in duo with Zazie. She won the final with 55,3 % of the public vote, becoming the first female and, at 17 years of age, the youngest candidate to ever win the French talent show.

On 14 July 2018, in Louhans, Maëlle gave her first public concert.

2019: First single and first album 
On 5 April 2019, Maëlle released her first single. Titled "Toutes les machines ont un cœur", it was composed by Calogero (who also produced the recording), with lyrics by Zazie. Three days before her BAC (in Social & Economics Sciences, or SES), she was in Barcelona shooting the music video for this song. Directed by Nur Casadevall, it premiered on YouTube on 29 July 2019.

On 6 September 2019, Maëlle released (on YouTube) a music video for a live version of another track from her forthcoming album, a song titled "L'Effet de masse". The song entered the French download chart at number 68 (during the week of 13 September).

On 23 September 2019, she released (on YouTube) a music video for yet another new song from her upcoming album, "Le Pianiste des gares".

At the end of September, Maëlle was nominated for the 2019 NRJ Music Award in the category "French Revelation of the Year".

On 4 October 2019, she released (on YouTube) a music video for the song "Sur un coup de tête". The song entered the French download chart at number 75  (during the week of 11 October).

Her first album, titled simply Maëlle, was released on 22 November 2019. The entire album was composed and produced by Calogero.

Discography

Albums

Singles

Other charted songs

Awards and nominations

NRJ Music Awards 

|-
| 2019
| Maëlle
| French Revelation of the Year
|

References 

Living people
2001 births
The Voice (franchise) winners
Mercury Records artists
Universal Music France artists
21st-century French women singers